| tries ={{#expr:
 + 6 + 6 + 4
 + 5 + 1 + 0
 + 2 + 2 + 1
 + 1 + 2 + 1
 + 1 + 2 + 3
}}
| top point scorer =  Leigh Halfpenny (74)
| top try scorer =  Alex Cuthbert (4)
| Player of the tournament =  Leigh Halfpenny
| website = 
| previous year = 2012
| previous tournament = 2012 Six Nations Championship
| next year = 2014
| next tournament = 2014 Six Nations Championship
}}

The 2013 Six Nations Championship, known as the 2013 RBS 6 Nations because of the tournament's sponsorship by the Royal Bank of Scotland, was the 14th series of the Six Nations Championship, the annual northern hemisphere rugby union championship. It was contested by England, France, Ireland, Italy, Scotland and Wales.

Including the competition's previous incarnations as the Home Nations Championship and Five Nations Championship, it was the 119th edition of the tournament. Wales won the tournament for the second time in two years, the first time they had won back-to-back championships since their 1978 and 1979 wins. France collected the wooden spoon by finishing last for the first time since 1999. It was also the first time every team managed to win at least 3 competition points (the equivalent of a win and a draw or three draws) since 1974.

Participants

2 Except the round 3 match as he was suspended.

Squads

Overview

At the start of the 2013 Six Nations Championships England were favoured to win by many pundits after they beat the world champion New Zealand team in December 2012. France, enjoying a winning streak prior to the competition, were also considered strong contenders. In contrast defending champions Wales had suffered seven consecutive defeats (4 versus Australia) and were without their regular head coach Warren Gatland. Expectations regarding England and Wales were confirmed in the first round of matches, played on 2 February, with England enjoying a convincing 38–18 victory against Scotland and Wales losing 22–30 against Ireland despite a Welsh comeback from 3-30 down just after half time. France however were upset in their first game, going down 23–18 against Italy. The following week both England and Wales won their matches, against Ireland and France respectively. Scotland meanwhile beat Italy 34–10 in the other game, their first Six Nations victory since 2011. In round three Wales defeated Italy 9–26 and England beat France 23–13. In the remaining match, Scotland defeated Ireland for a second consecutive victory. Wales won their round four clash against Scotland 26-13 and in the process achieved a record fifth consecutive away win in the Six Nations. England remained undefeated after beating Italy 18-11. Ireland and France tied 13–13, giving France their first points in the competition.

England having won all four matches to this point (on 8 points) and Wales with three victories (6 points) meant that their match against each other in the final week, on 16 March, would determine the champions. A victory by Wales would give them two points and put them on equal footing with England. If they won by more than seven points they would move ahead on points differential and retain the title. England were slight favourites heading into the game due to their unbeaten run, although Wales had the advantage of a more experienced side and playing at home in the Millennium Stadium. Going into the final round Scotland were on 4 points, Ireland on 3, Italy on 2 and France on 1. Italy ended up beating Ireland and Scotland lost to France, giving Scotland and Italy 4 points each (with Scotland finishing ahead on points differential) and Ireland and France 3 points each (with Ireland finishing ahead on points differential). France ended up with the wooden spoon, the first time they had finished last in the competition since 1999.

Wales defeated England by an emphatic 30–3, their biggest ever win over England. At half time Wales had just a 9-3 lead, with three penalties to fullback Leigh Halfpenny against one from England's Owen Farrell. The first 20 minutes of the second half saw Wales score points through a try to winger Alex Cuthbert, and another penalty goal to Halfpenny. This gave them a comfortable 17-3 lead heading into the last quarter of the game. Wales fly half Dan Biggar dropped a goal, which was then followed by a second try to Cuthbert in the 66th minute to put the game beyond England. Biggar kicked a final penalty with 10 minutes to go to give Wales their 30–3 victory. Wales coach Rob Howley described the victory as a better achievement than their 2012 Grand Slam and Welsh captain Sam Warburton described the win as the "best moment" of his career. England coach Stuart Lancaster admitted that his side "didn't turn up" to their final match.

Table

Fixtures
As with the 2012 Six Nations Championship, there were no Friday night fixtures.

Round 1

Notes:
Andrew Coombs and Olly Kohn (both Wales) made their international debuts.
This was the first time that Wales had lost five consecutive matches at home in their history after losing four consecutive matches in the 2012 Autumn internationals and this match.

Notes:
 Euan Murray (Scotland) earned his 50th cap.
 England retained the Calcutta Cup they won in  2012.
 Scotland's Sean Maitland and England's Billy Twelvetrees each scored a try on their debuts in this game.

Notes:
 Italy reclaimed the Giuseppe Garibaldi Trophy after losing it in  2012.

Round 2

Notes:
 Leonardo Ghiraldini (Italy) earned his 50th cap.
 Scotland's first Six Nations win since their 21–8 win over Italy in the 2011 Six Nations Championship.
 This was Scotland's first home win since their 23–12 win over Italy in their 2011 Rugby World Cup warm-up test match.

Notes:
 Jamie Roberts (Wales) earned his 50th cap.
 This was Wales' first win since their 16–9  Grand Slam victory over France in the 2012 Six Nations Championship.
 Wales' first back to back win over France since  1999 and the first time they have won in France since their  Grand Slam triumph in  2005 .
 This was the first time that France had lost their opening two matches in the Six Nations Championship since the competition became the Six Nations in  2000. The last time they lost their first two games was in  1982.

Notes:
 This was the lowest scoring match since the competition became the Six Nations in  2000.
 This win was England's first Six Nations victory in Ireland since their  Grand Slam triumph in  2003.
 England retained the Millennium Trophy they won in  2012.

Round 3

Notes:
 Alastair Kellock (Scotland) earned his 50th cap.
 Paddy Jackson (Ireland) made his international debut.
 This was the first time Scotland had won consecutive matches within the tournament since  2001 after beating Italy then Ireland.
 Scotland won the Centenary Quaich which they last won in  2010.

Round 4

Notes:
 Ryan Wilson (Scotland) made his international debut.
 18 penalties were attempted in this match, a record for an international match.
 This was Wales' fifth consecutive away victory in the Six Nations, a national and tournament record.

Notes:
 Eoin Reddan (Ireland) and Morgan Parra (France) earned their 50th caps.
 Ian Madigan (Ireland) made his international debut.
 This is the first time France and Ireland have drawn two consecutive matches against each other, the first time this has happened since England and France drew three consecutive matches in  1959,  1960 and  1961.

Notes
 Closest winning margin between the sides in England.

Round 5

Notes:
 This is Italy's first double win in the Six Nations since  2007.
 First Italian win against Ireland in the Six Nations and since  1997.
 With this defeat, Ireland dropped to 9th in the IRB World Rankings, their lowest position since the rankings began.

Notes:
 James Haskell (England) earned his 50th cap.
 This was Wales' biggest ever win over England.
 This was Wales' first back-to-back titles since they won the Five Nations Championship in 1978 and 1979.

 Gaël Fickou (France) and Grant Gilchrist (Scotland) made their international debuts.
 Despite winning this match, France finished last in the table for the first time since  1999, and was awarded the wooden spoon as a result.

Statistics

Points scorers

Try scorers

Media coverage
In the United Kingdom, BBC One televised the all matches live apart from the round five match between France and Scotland which was televised live on both BBC HD and BBC Two. There was also a forum show on the BBC Red Button for satellite, cable and Freeview viewers after several matches. Four days after the conclusion of the tournament, there was a highlights programme called “Wales v England: We Did It!” shown at 10:50pm on BBC One in Wales.

In Wales, Wales matches were televised live in Welsh by S4C.

Elsewhere, the tournament's matches were televised live by RTÉ in Ireland, France Télévisions in France, Sky Italia in Italy, ESPN in Australia, New Zealand, Pacific Islands and Japan, SuperSport in South Africa, ESPN+ in Latin America, ESPN Brasil in Brazil, Setanta Sports Asia in Southeast Asia, Dolce Sport in Romania, Nova Sports in Greece, Sport TV in Portugal, Sport 1 in eastern Europe as well as Channel 9, Arena Sport TV and Canal+.

In the United States, BBC America televised one match from each week live while Universal Sports televised all the matches in delay as did Sportsnet World in Canada.

References

External links
2013 Six Nations Championship at ESPN

 
2013 rugby union tournaments for national teams
2013
2012–13 in European rugby union
2012–13 in Irish rugby union
2012–13 in English rugby union
2012–13 in Welsh rugby union
2012–13 in Scottish rugby union
2012–13 in French rugby union
2012–13 in Italian rugby union
February 2013 sports events in Europe
March 2013 sports events in Europe
Royal Bank of Scotland